Jack Warren Pierce (born September 23, 1962 in Cherry Hill, New Jersey) is an American former hurdling athlete

Raised in Woodbury, New Jersey, he graduated Woodbury High School in 1980. He attended the Morgan State University on a track scholarship.

At the 1991 World Championships, Pierce placed second behind Greg Foster, and at the 1992 Summer Olympics in Barcelona, Pierce finished third. Jack's personal best time was 12.94 seconds.

He was coached by Norman Tate, a former triple jumper who competed at the 1968 Mexico City Olympics.

Pierce and his family have been residents of Lumberton Township, New Jersey.

References

External links
 

1962 births
Living people
American male hurdlers
African-American male track and field athletes
Athletes (track and field) at the 1992 Summer Olympics
Morgan State Bears men's track and field athletes
Olympic bronze medalists for the United States in track and field
People from Cherry Hill, New Jersey
People from Lumberton Township, New Jersey
Sportspeople from Woodbury, New Jersey
World Athletics Championships medalists
Medalists at the 1992 Summer Olympics
Track and field athletes from New Jersey
Woodbury Junior-Senior High School alumni
21st-century African-American people
20th-century African-American sportspeople